Masoud Roghani Zanjani (was born in Zanjan) is an Iranian academic, economist, scholar and vice president of Iran in the cabinet of Mohammad-Reza Mahdavi Kani, Mir-Hossein Mousavi and Akbar Hashemi Rafsanjani in the section of Management and Planning Organization of Iran. he is professor of Economic development and Economics in Allameh Tabataba'i University. The record of presidency in the Management and Planning Organisation is by Masoud Roghani Zanjani 14 years experience.

References 

Living people
People from Zanjan, Iran
Vice presidents of Iran
Iranian economists
Year of birth missing (living people)